"Pussy" is a song by Lords of Acid. It is written by Jade 4 U, Oliver Adams, & Praga Khan. It is featured on the album Our Little Secret.

Lyrics include: “They tell me it’s soft to touch and really smooth/ I can hardly wait to feel that pussy too /You wanna play with pussy all the time /To hide that kind of pussy is a crime.”

Track listing
Belgian Maxi Single
 "Pussy (Box Banger)" – 5:39	
 "Pussy (Damage Twins 12" Mix)" – 7:35	
 "Pussy (We Want Some)" – 5:38	
 "Pussy (DJ Harald's 3 PM Dubmix)" – 5:16	
 "Pussy (Praga Khan's Radio Edit)" – 3:27	
 "Pussy (Our Little Secret Album Version)" – 3:28

Belgian Mini Single
 "Pussy (Oliver Adams Radio Edit)" – 3:28	
 "Pussy (Praga Khan's Radio Edit)" – 3:33

Belgian 12" Single
 "Pussy (Damage Twins 12" Mix)" – 7:35	
 "Pussy (Praga Khan's Radio-Edit)" – 3:33	
 "Pussy (DJ Harald's 3 PM Dubmix)" – 5:16	
 "Pussy (Oliver Adams Radio-Edit)" – 3:28

Belgian "Pussy (Remixes)" Single
 "Pussy (Box Banger)" – 5:34
 "Pussy (Box Banger No Frills)" – 5:24	
 "Pussy (We Want Some)" – 5:16	
 "Pussy (We Want Some More)" – 4:54

US Maxi Single
 "Pussy (Box Banger)" – 5:42	
 "Pussy (LP Version)	4:06	
 "Pussy (Khan & Adams 12" Mix)" – 5:18	
 "Pussy (DJ Harald's 3PM Dub)" – 5:12	
 "Pussy (We Want Some)" – 5:39	
 "Pussy (We Want Some More)" – 5:08	
 "Pussy (Box Banger – No Frills)" – 5:42	
 "Pussy (The Power is Mine ("In Your Hand" Mix))" – 5:50

US 12" Single
 "Pussy (Box Banger)" – 5:34
 "Pussy (Box Banger – No Frills)" – 5:24	
 "Pussy (We Want Some)" – 5:16	
 "Pussy (Khan & Adams Mix)" – 5:18
 "Pussy (The Power is Mine "In Your Hand" Mix)" – 5:50
 "Pussy (DJ Harald's 3 PM Dub)" – 5:16

Australian Maxi Single
 "Pussy (Praga Khan's Radio Edit)" – 3:33
 "Pussy (Our Little Secret Album Version)" – 3:28		
 "Pussy (We Want Some)" – 5:16
 "Pussy (DJ Harald's 3 P.M. Dub Mix)" – 5:16

German Maxi Single
 "Pussy (Damage Twins 12" Mix)" – 7:35	
 "Pussy (Our Little Secret Album Version)" – 4:02	
 "Pussy (Oliver Adams Radio Edit)" – 3:28	
 "Pussy (Box Banger)" – 5:34	
 "Pussy (We Want Some) (Think Tank)" – 5:16	
 "Pussy (Praga Khan's Radio Edit)" – 3:33	
 "Pussy (DJ Harald's 3PM Dub Mix)" – 5:16

References

1998 singles
1998 songs